Bottom Live 3: Hooligan's Island is a live stage show that was recorded at the Bristol Hippodrome, Bristol, in 1997, written by and starring Rik Mayall and Adrian Edmondson. This is the third instalment of five live shows based on the television show Bottom.

Plot

Act one
Richard "Richie" Richard (Mayall) and Edward Elizabeth "Eddie" Hitler (Edmondson) have been stuck on the titular uncharted island for three years. The show begins with Richie stuck in the island's latrine and getting himself out. Eddie enters and tells him that he rescued an unconscious "bird"
from the beach and placed her in his hammock. Richie eagerly starts to administer the "Shag of Life"...and discovers that the "bird" is actually an albatross. After starting a fight with Eddie (and losing, as usual), Richie prepares breakfast: brambles and a dying fish he found in the latrine. Richie gets food poisoning and involuntarily vomits, burps, and farts. The pair then suddenly hear the sound of drums and spot a group of Welsh cannibals cooking Keith Floyd in a pot nearby. The cannibals notice and hunt them. Richie manages to fend them off by vomiting in their direction (an effect of the food poisoning), but the cannibals land a poison dart on the tip of Richie's penis and the brim of Eddie's hat as they flee. To save Richie's life, Eddie retrieves a Japanese army World War II medical kit from his secret Japanese bunker and injects an antidote directly into his buttocks via a giant medical syringe (in the recording of the show this is done after Eddie manages to work through a blooper he had caused making Richie see the entrance to the bunker BEFORE he was meant to see it in the second act, claiming that the dart has also giving Richie momentary amnesia, for the bunker only). After a male albatross (presumably the mate of the unconscious female albatross) arrives and defecates on Eddie's head, he and Richie recap on how they ended up on Hooligan's Island in the first place.

It all started when Eddie talked Richie into taking Ecstasy for the first time, resulting in them both performing the non-stop "Nightmare 12-Hour Dance," getting chased by the police, and hijacking an ambulance. While on the run, they encountered a seemingly-homosexual theatrical impresario, Sir "Pervy" Leslie McBlowjob, who was willing to give them a job in exchange for sexual favours (i.e. presumably inserting a spade into his rectum). They were then set to perform onstage aboard a cruise liner as "The Great Arsehole (Richie) and Norman (Eddie)," but their performance went horribly wrong. It consisted of a nude Eddie (penis in a vodka bottle as part of his Molotov cocktail impression) shoving a sword down a passenger's throat and throwing rabbits into the audience, Richie sawing the ship's captain in half with an electric chainsaw (which got soaked in blood and malfunctioned mid-way), and Eddie crashing a motorcycle and sidecar into the disco console during the "Curtain of Death" finale. As a result, the entire ship was set on fire. In a desperate attempt to quench the fire, Eddie tore a hole through the ship with an ax, which caused the ship to fill with water and sink. With all available lifeboats full, Richie and Eddie survived the shipwreck by holding onto Eddie's electric organ for six hours until they reached land.

After delivering the full recap, Richie and Eddie look for ways to pass the time while they wait to be rescued and taken back to Hammersmith, London. They end the play's first act by briefly performing a cover of "Born to Be Wild" and rehearsing their specialty act "The Great Arsehole and Norman."

Act two

Still waiting to be rescued, Richie and Eddie try discussing interests and watching sharks, until they find a 15 megaton nuclear bomb in the middle of the island. It was left behind by a French frogman (who had a three-month supply of food, booze, and porn magazines) whom Eddie told to 'fuck off outta here' as part of a nuclear testing program. After accidentally activating the bomb, Richie and Eddie try various methods to defuse it (e.g. using tools from Eddie's secret Japanese bunker, banging Richie's head on its surface until it shuts down, etc.) Near the end of the play, a French boat sails nearby and Richie and Eddie desperately try to grab their attention in hope of rescue. Eddie lights and detonates signal flares which accidentally hit the ship and causes it to explode. The play ends with Richie and Eddie running out of time: the nuclear bomb explodes with them both near it.

VHS & DVD Release
Shortly after it was filmed, it was released on VHS, and in 1999, it was released on DVD.

In late 2006, a DVD box set titled the Big Bottom Box, contains the show, along with the other 4 live shows, the movie and a "Best of Bottom Live" mockumentary titled Big Bottom Live.

Television adaptation
On 23 August 2012, the BBC announced that Hooligan's Island was to be adapted into a television series. The show would be a spin-off sequel to Mayall and Edmondson's BBC Two sitcom, Bottom, and was due to air on BBC Two in 2013.

On 15 October 2012, Edmondson announced during an interview with BBC Radio Essex that he had pulled out of the new series of Hooligan's Island, stating that he wished to pursue other interests.

References

1997 plays
British plays
Comedy plays
Bottom (TV series)